The 1954–55 season was the 75th season of competitive football in England, from August 1954 to May 1955.

Overview
Chelsea, managed by legendary former Arsenal forward Ted Drake, celebrate their 50th anniversary by winning the league championship. They finish four points ahead of their nearest three rivals Wolverhampton Wanderers, Portsmouth and Sunderland.

Manchester United's new-look side with an emphasis on youth finish fifth, their title hopes dashed only by a slow start to the season. Just before the end of the season, their 18-year-old half-back Duncan Edwards becomes the youngest full England international of the 20th century.

Tottenham Hotspur can only manage a 16th-place finish in the First Division, despite the acquisition of skilful half-back Danny Blanchflower from Aston Villa.

This was the first season in Liverpool F.C.'s history in which they had played in the second division and not been champions. They had had three seasons in the division previously – 1893–94, 1895–96 and 1904–05, and were immediately promoted as champions each time.

Newcastle United win the FA Cup for the sixth time, matching the record set by Aston Villa. Three of those victories have come in the last five seasons.

UEFA announces that the European Champions Cup will be introduced from next season, to be contested between the champions of European domestic leagues, including those from Eastern Bloc countries.

Events
 29 September 1954 – Champions Wolverhampton Wanderers and FA Cup holders West Bromwich Albion share the Charity Shield after a 4–4 draw.
 16 November 1954 – Wolverhampton Wanderers defeat Spartak Moscow 4–0 at Molineux, a team widely regarded as one of the best in the world.
 11 December 1954 – Liverpool suffer the heaviest defeat of their history, losing 9–1 at Birmingham City in the Second Division.
 13 December 1954 – Wolves restore some pride to English football with a 3–2 win over Budapest Honvéd FC of Hungary, a team containing seven Hungarian internationals who defeated England 6–3 at Wembley in 1953, including Ferenc Puskás. It prompts the famous newspaper headline, which proclaims Wolves as the champions of the world.
 April 1955 – Gabriel Hanot's proposal for a European Champions' Cup is formally endorsed at the UEFA Congress.
 2 April 1955 – England win the British Home Championship after a 7–2 defeat of Scotland, in which the 40-year-old Stanley Matthews creates five goals and the 18-year-old Manchester United protégé Duncan Edwards makes his debut.
 16 April 1955 – Chelsea go four points clear of reigning league champions Wolverhampton in second with a draw with Portsmouth: the Londoners have two matches remaining of the season while Wolves have three. Six points behind the Pensioners are Portsmouth, Sunderland and Manchester City: the latter are chasing the Double, having qualified for the 1955 FA Cup Final.
 18 April 1955 – Inauguration of the Inter-Cities Fairs Cup.
 23 April 1955 – Chelsea secure the championship with a 3–0 home win against Sheffield Wednesday.
 4 May 1955 – Birmingham City win 5–1 at Doncaster Rovers to finish level on points with both Luton Town and Rotherham United in the Second Division. On goal average, Birmingham are promoted as champions, Luton as runners-up while Rotherham miss out.
 7 May 1955 – Newcastle United win the FA Cup, defeating Manchester City 3–1 at Wembley. Jackie Milburn opens the scoring after just 45 seconds – a Wembley Cup final record which stands for the next 42 years.

Honours

Notes = Number in parentheses is the times that club has won that honour. * indicates new record for competition

Awards
Football Writers' Association
 Footballer of the Year – Don Revie (Manchester City)
Top goalscorer
 Ronnie Allen (West Bromwich Albion), 27

Football League

First Division

Second Division

Third Division North

Third Division South

Top goalscorers

First Division
Ronnie Allen (West Bromwich) – 27 goals

Second Division
Tommy Briggs (Blackburn Rovers) – 33 goals

Third Division North
Don Travis (Oldham Athletic), John Connor (Stockport County) and Arthur Bottom (York City) – 30 goals

Third Division South
Ernie Morgan (Gillingham) – 31 goals

Non-League honours

National team

References